The UD SLF is a rear-engined single-decker bus, and also a semi-low-floor city bus made by the UD Trucks. The other city buses of UD is the UD BRT. The BRT is an articulated bus unlike the SLF, which is a rigid bus.

About 
The SLF is named from semi low-floor. (Incidentally, the BRT is named from bus rapid transit. )

It has 36 seats and Denso air-conditioning, and is 12 meters length.

The GH8 engine is 6 cylinder 8 liter Euro IV diesel engine (turbocharged and intercooled), and ZF 6-speed automatic (230 hp at 2200rpm).

Anti-lock Brake System, Door Brake System, Neutral Bus Stopping and 3-point seat belts are installed.

The manufacturer of the bus is UD Trucks. The body of prototype was made by Volvo Buses India, but the body of main model is made by Volvo/SM Kannapa JV plant.

History 
In 2014, the Volvo Group introduced UD Buses project. The UD Buses is included the Volvo Buses, and includes city buses and coaches. The market of UD Buses is India at first, but it will be other Asian country finally, too.

In 2015, the prototype of the UD SLF was started running at Bangalore Metropolitan Transport Corporation in Bangalore.

See also 

 UD Trucks
 UD Buses
 UD BRT
 UD Quester
 UD Croner
 UD Kuzer
 Volvo Buses

References

External links 

 Official website

Bus chassis
Full-size buses
Low-floor buses
Vehicles introduced in 2015
UD trucks